The 34th Yukon Legislative Assembly commenced on November 8, 2016, after Yukon voters defeated the Yukon Party government under the leadership of Darrell Pasloski and returned a Liberal majority government under the leadership of Sandy Silver. The Yukon Party was reduced to Official Opposition status and the New Democrats were reduced to Third Party status.

It is the second Liberal government in Yukon history.

First Session

The first session of the 34th Legislative Assembly was convened on January 12, 2017. The single-day session was called by the Premier in order to allow the legislature to elect a new Speaker (Nils Clarke) and establish committee membership from among the MLAs. In a rarity, there was no indication from the government as to what its legislative agenda would look like in its term, as the government signaled its preference to use a late spring sitting for its Speech from the Throne.

The short one-day session drew criticism from the Opposition, which claimed that the government had denied them the opportunity to hold the government to account through either debate or Question Periods.

The Premier later called a second sitting of the Legislative Assembly for April 20; five months since the government was sworn into office. According to the Whitehorse Star, since the beginning of party politics in the Yukon in 1978, no government had gone so long between an election and its first Question Period. The decision drew fire from the Opposition, who labeled it a "profound lack of respect for the legislature." Premier Silver also drew criticism for authorizing nearly $30 million in Special Warrant spending - money approved without legislative oversight - a practice he decried while in Opposition himself. Weeks later, Silver authorized an even larger Special Warrant - this time worth up to $427 million, with $334 million related to operation and maintenance funds and $93 million to capital plans up to June 30, 2017. This new Special Warrant, the largest in Yukon history by more than double, drew severe criticism from the Opposition, who labeled Silver's actions as hypocritical.

Executive Council

The new Executive Council of the Yukon (Cabinet) was sworn in on December 3, 2016. Premier Silver appointed six ministers; a Cabinet that was smaller than his predecessors. The Cabinet was the second gender-balanced Cabinet in Yukon history, following in the footsteps of the previous Liberal Premier Pat Duncan.

The Executive Council was made up of members of the Yukon Liberal Party

Leadership changes

Darrell Pasloski was defeated in his riding of Mountainview on election night and was unable to return to the Yukon Legislative Assembly to lead the Yukon Party. After losing government status and falling to six seats, the Yukon Party appointed Stacey Hassard as interim leader. He is also interim Leader of the Official Opposition until the Yukon Party chooses a permanent replacement in the spring of 2017.

Seating plan

Members

Italicized text indicates a member of cabinet. Bold text indicates a party leader. Both indicates the Premier of Yukon

References

External links
Yukon Legislature

Yukon Legislative Assemblies
Lists of people from Yukon
2016 in Yukon
2017 in Yukon
2018 in Yukon
2019 in Yukon
2020 in Yukon
2016 establishments in Yukon
2016 in Canadian politics
2017 in Canadian politics
2018 in Canadian politics
2019 in Canadian politics
2020 in Canadian politics
Yukon politics-related lists